NGC 543 is an elliptical galaxy in the constellation Cetus. It is estimated to be 239 million light years from the Milky Way and has a diameter of approximately 40,000 ly. NGC 543 was discovered by the German-Danish astronomer Heinrich Louis d'Arrest. It is a member of the galaxy cluster Abell 194.

See also 
 List of NGC objects (1–1000)

References

External links 
 

Elliptical galaxies
0543
Cetus (constellation)
005311